Life of Lemon is a 2011 drama film. It stars Barry Kneller, Rachel Miner, Dan Lauria and Beth Grant. It is directed by Randy Kent and written by Barry Kneller.

Cast
Barry Kneller as Lemon
Rachel Miner as Esther
Beth Grant as Phyllis
Dan Lauria as Arthur
Mimi Kennedy as Louise Phillips
John Farley as Jimmy
Todd Sherry as LJ
Rahvaunia as Cindy
Tom Ohmer as Peter Cardale

External links
 
 
 

2011 films
American drama films
2011 drama films
2010s English-language films
2010s American films